Karl Smith may refer to:

Karl Smith (athlete) (born 1959), Jamaican hurdler
Karl Smith (cricketer) (born 1978), English cricketer
Karl U. Smith (1907–1994), American physiologist, psychologist and behavioral cybernetician

See also 
Carl Smith (disambiguation)